Tomasz Cebula (born 31 March 1966 in Brzeziny) is a retired Polish professional footballer who played for Legia Warsaw and ŁKS Łódź in the Polish Ekstraklasa.

Cebula made 12 appearances for the Poland national football team.

References

External links
 
 

1966 births
Living people
Polish footballers
Poland international footballers
Legia Warsaw players
Zagłębie Lubin players
Siarka Tarnobrzeg players
ŁKS Łódź players
Śląsk Wrocław players
Hapoel Petah Tikva F.C. players
Hapoel Rishon LeZion F.C. players
Expatriate footballers in Israel
Expatriate footballers in Vietnam
People from Brzeziny
Sportspeople from Łódź Voivodeship
Association football forwards
Polish expatriate sportspeople in Israel
Polish expatriate sportspeople in Vietnam